Severe Disablement Allowance (SDA) was a United Kingdom state benefit intended for those below the state pension age who cannot work because of illness or disability. It was replaced by Incapacity Benefit in April 2001, which itself was replaced by Employment and Support Allowance. However, although it is no longer possible to make a claim for SDA, individuals who are already receiving the benefit have continued to do so. The benefit is administered by Jobcentre Plus (an executive agency of the Department for Work and Pensions).

Eligibility

An individual could have been eligible for Severe Disablement Allowance if:

they were assessed as being at least 80 per cent disabled and:
they were incapable of work because of illness or disability for at least 28 weeks in a row 
they were between 16 and 64 years old 

It was also possible for claimants of Severe Disablement Allowance to receive a 'top-up' of Income Support payments before that benefit was discontinued. SDA is now being withdrawn and those claimants are being asked to claim ESA instead which requires a fresh application for benefit.

External links
 Government Website for SDA
 Directgov factsheet about Severe Disablement Allowance (1)
 Directgov factsheet about Severe Disablement Allowance (2)
 Patient UK leaflet about Severe Disablement Allowance
 Severe Disablement Allowance information at DWP
 Social Security Agency information about Severe Disablement Allowance

Social security in the United Kingdom
Disability in the United Kingdom